Parmotrema appendiculatum is a species of lichen in the family Parmeliaceae. Found in South America, it was originally described by French botanist Antoine Laurent Apollinaire Fée in 1837 as a species of Parmelia. Mason Hale transferred it to the genus Parmotrema in 1974.

See also
List of Parmotrema species

References

appendiculatum
Lichen species
Lichens described in 1837
Lichens of South America
Taxa named by Antoine Laurent Apollinaire Fée